CLR may refer to:

 Calcium Lime Rust, a household cleaning-product
 California Law Review, a publication by the UC Berkeley School of Law
 Centerline Radius, a term in the tubing industry used to describe the radius of a bend
 Central London Railway, an underground railway line in London - now the central part of the London Underground's Central line
 Chief Langalibalele Rifles, an infantry regiment of the South African Army
 Cliff Hatfield Memorial Airport, an airport in Calipatria, California
 CLR (formerly Computer Language Research), a subsidiary of Thomson Reuters Tax & Accounting
 Coffee leaf rust, a plant disease caused by the fungus Hemileia vastatrix
 Combat Logistics Regiment, a type of United States Marine Corps regiment
 Command, Leadership, Resource management, another acronym for Cockpit Resource Management
 Commando Logistic Regiment, a logistic regiment of the Royal Marines
 Commonwealth Law Reports, reports of decisions of the High Court of Australia
 Compagnie Luxembourgeoise de Radiodiffusion, a Luxembourg-based radio-broadcaster - part of RTL Group
 Compensation Log Record, a type of database log record
 Council on Library Resources, USA
 Mercedes-Benz CLR, a racing-car
 The Circle of Liberal Reformers, a political party in Gabon
 A nickname for Introduction to Algorithms by Cormen, Leiserson, and Rivest

Technology
 Circuit layout record
 Clear instruction in some computer programming assembly languages
 Common Language Runtime, the virtual-machine component of Microsoft .NET
 Current-Limiting Resistor, an electronic component